Invincible Overlord is a side-project band by Tom Dumont (No Doubt) and Ted Matson. The duo was formed after No Doubt's vocalist, Gwen Stefani, decided to pursue a solo career, and the other members began starting families. Invincible Overlord's only album, The Living Album, is available as a free download on the band's website . The album's first five tracks were released in May 2005: "Through the Years", "Powercell", "My Light Is as Bright as the Sun", "Maryland", and "Behind the Mountains". Two new songs were added in January 2006 and August 2007, "You Are Alone" and "Everything Will Be Fine", respectively. As stated on the website, more pieces will be added as they are completed.

Invincible Overlord remixed No Doubt's single "Bathwater" in 2004 in promotion for the No Doubt best-of, The Singles 1992-2003, and created "I Become the Sky" for the soundtrack to The Providence Effect (2009).

Discography

Studio albums

Single

Guest appearances

See also 
 No Doubt
 Tom Dumont

References

External links 
 Official Website

American musical duos
American alternative rock groups
Musical groups established in 2003
Remixers